Jordan Creek is a stream in Clay and Owen counties, in the U.S. state of Indiana. It is a tributary of the Eel River.

The stream was named after the Jordan River in West Asia.

See also
List of rivers of Indiana

References

Rivers of Clay County, Indiana
Rivers of Owen County, Indiana
Rivers of Indiana